The 2012–13 season was Queens Park Rangers's 124th professional season and their sixth season in the Premier League. They were relegated on 28 April 2013 after a goalless draw with Reading at the Madejski Stadium.

Players
As of the end of the season.

First team squad

Reserves and development squad

Out on loan

Transfers

In

Out

Loans in

Loans out

Season statistics

Premier League table

Results summary

Pre-season

Competitions

Premier League

FA Cup

League Cup

Player statistics

Appearances, goals and discipline

Goalscorers

Clean sheets

Notes

References

Queens Park Rangers F.C. seasons
Queens Park Rangers